Ipperwash may refer to:
The Ipperwash Crisis, a land dispute crisis in Ontario, Canada
Ipperwash Provincial Park, a provincial park in Ontario, Canada
Camp Ipperwash, a former Canadian Armed Forces training site